This is a list of 114 species in Neolygus, a genus of plant bugs in the family Miridae.

Neolygus species

 Neolygus aceris (Kerzhner, 1988) c g
 Neolygus aesculi Knight, 1953 c g
 Neolygus alni (Knight, 1917) c g
 Neolygus angustiverticis Lu and Zheng, 2004 c g
 Neolygus atricallus (Kelton, 1971) c g
 Neolygus atrinotatus (Knight, 1917) c g
 Neolygus atritylus (Knight, 1917) c g
 Neolygus belfragii (Reuter, 1876) c g
 Neolygus betulae Knight, 1953 c g
 Neolygus bimaculatus (Lu and Zheng, 1996) c
 Neolygus bipuncticollis (Poppius, 1915) c
 Neolygus bui Lu and Zheng, 2004 c g
 Neolygus canadensis (Knight, 1917) c g
 Neolygus carpini Knight, 1939 c g
 Neolygus carvalhoi Lu and Zheng, 2004 c g
 Neolygus caryae (Knight, 1917) c g b  (hickory plant bug)
 Neolygus chinensis (Lu and Yasunaga, 1994) c g
 Neolygus clavigenitalis (Knight, 1917) c g
 Neolygus communis (Knight, 1916) c g b  (pear plant bug)
 Neolygus contaminatus (Fallén, 1807) c g
 Neolygus coryli (Kulik, 1965) c g
 Neolygus crataegi Henry, 2007 c g
 Neolygus disciger (Poppius, 1915) c g
 Neolygus elaegni (Yasunaga, 1999) c g
 Neolygus esakii (Yasunaga, 1991) c g
 Neolygus fagi (Knight, 1917) c g
 Neolygus fanjingensis Zheng, 2004 c g
 Neolygus flaviceps (Yasunaga, 1991) c g
 Neolygus flavoviridis (Yasunaga, 1991) c g
 Neolygus fraxini (Kerzhner, 1988) c g
 Neolygus gansuensis (Lu and H. Wang, 1996) c g
 Neolygus geminus Knight, 1941 c g
 Neolygus geneseensis (Knight, 1917) c g
 Neolygus hakusanensis (Yasunaga, 1991) c g
 Neolygus hani Lu and Zheng, 2004 c g
 Neolygus hebeiensis Lu and Zheng, 2004 c g
 Neolygus hirticulus (Van Duzee, 1916) c g b
 Neolygus hoberlandti (Kulik, 1965) c g
 Neolygus honshuensis (Linnavuori, 1961) c g
 Neolygus ichitai (Yasunaga, 1991) c g
 Neolygus inconspicuus (Knight, 1917) c g b
 Neolygus indicus (Poppius, 1914) c
 Neolygus invitus (Say, 1832) c g
 Neolygus johnsoni (Knight, 1917) c g
 Neolygus juglandis (Kerzhner, 1988) c g
 Neolygus kawasawai Yasunaga and Schwartz, 2005 c g
 Neolygus keltoni (Lu and Zheng, 1998) c g
 Neolygus knighti (Kelton, 1971) c g
 Neolygus kyushensis (Yasunaga, 1991) c g
 Neolygus lativerticis (Lu and Y. Wang, 1997) c g
 Neolygus laureae (Knight, 1917) c g b
 Neolygus liui Lu and Zheng, 2004 c g
 Neolygus lobatus (Linnavuori, 1963) c g
 Neolygus longiusculus (Kulik, 1965) c g
 Neolygus machanensis Yasunaga, Duwal, and Schwartz, 2012 c g
 Neolygus majusculus (Yasunaga, 1999) c g
 Neolygus makiharai (Yasunaga, 1992) c g
 Neolygus matsumurae (Poppius, 1915) c g
 Neolygus meridionalis Lu and Zheng, 2004 c g
 Neolygus miyamotoi (Yasunaga, 1991) c g
 Neolygus mjohjangsanicus (Josifov, 1992) c g
 Neolygus monticola Lu and Zheng, 2004 c g
 Neolygus nakatanii (Yasunaga, 1999) c g
 Neolygus neglectus (Knight, 1917) c g
 Neolygus nemoralis (Kulik, 1965) c g
 Neolygus nigriscutellaris Lu & Zheng, 2004 g
 Neolygus nigroscutellaris Lu and Zheng, 2004 c g
 Neolygus nipponicus (Yasunaga, 1991) c g
 Neolygus nyssae (Knight, 1918) c g
 Neolygus obesus (Yasunaga, 1991) c g
 Neolygus omnivagus (Knight, 1917) c g
 Neolygus ostryae (Knight, 1917) c g
 Neolygus parrotti (Knight, 1919) c g
 Neolygus parshleyi (Knight, 1917) c g
 Neolygus partitus (Walker, 1873) c g
 Neolygus philyrinus (Kerzhner, 1988) c g
 Neolygus piceicola (Kelton, 1971) c g
 Neolygus pictus Lu and Zheng, 2004 c g
 Neolygus populi (Leston, 1957) c g
 Neolygus pteleinus (Kerzhner, 1977) c g
 Neolygus quercalbae (Knight, 1917) c g
 Neolygus renae Lu and Zheng, 2004 c g
 Neolygus roseus (Yasunaga, 1991) c g
 Neolygus rufilorum (Lu and Zheng, 1998) c g
 Neolygus rufostriatus Lu and Zheng, 2004 c g
 Neolygus ryoma Yasunaga and Schwartz, 2005 c g
 Neolygus salicicola (Lu and Zheng, 1998) c g
 Neolygus semivittatus (Knight, 1917) c g
 Neolygus shennongensis Lu and Zheng, 2004 c g
 Neolygus similis (Yasunaga, 1992) c g
 Neolygus simillimus (Lu and Zheng, 1998) c g
 Neolygus sondaicus (Poppius, 1914) c g
 Neolygus subrufilori Lu and Zheng, 2004 c g
 Neolygus sylvaticus (Josifov, 1992) c g
 Neolygus tiliae (Knight, 1917) c g b
 Neolygus tilianus (Lu and Zheng, 1996) c g
 Neolygus tiliicola (Kulik, 1965) c g
 Neolygus tinctus Knight, 1941 c g b
 Neolygus tokaraensis (Yasunaga, 1991) c g
 Neolygus tomokunii (Yasunaga, 1991) c g
 Neolygus tsugaruensis (Yasunaga, 1992) c g
 Neolygus univittatus (Knight, 1917) c g
 Neolygus viburni (Knight, 1917) c g
 Neolygus viridis (Fallén, 1807) c g
 Neolygus vitticollis (Reuter, 1876) c g b
 Neolygus vityazi (Kerzhner, 1988) c g
 Neolygus walleyi (Kelton, 1971) c g
 Neolygus wuyiensis (Lu and Zheng, 1998) c g
 Neolygus xizangensis (Lu and Zheng, 1998) c g
 Neolygus yamatoensis (Yasunaga, 1999) c g
 Neolygus yulongensis (Lu and Zheng, 1998) c g
 Neolygus zebei Gunther, 1997 g
 Neolygus zhengi (Lu and Yasunaga, 1994) c g
 Neolygus zhugei (Yasunaga, 1991) c g

Data sources: i = ITIS, c = Catalogue of Life, g = GBIF, b = Bugguide.net

References

Neolygus
Mirini